Irfan "Pipe" Smajlagić (born 16 October 1961) is a Bosnian-born Croatian former handball player and current coach, who competed in the 1988 Summer Olympics for Yugoslavia and in the 1996 Summer Olympics for Croatia.

In 1988 he was part of the Yugoslav national team, which won the bronze medal at the 1988 Olympics. He played five matches and scored 14 goals.

Eight years later he won the gold medal with the Croatian national team at the 1996 Olympics. He played six matches including the final and scored 31 goals.

His son Sven is a professional basketball player.

Honours

Player

Borac Banja Luka
Yugoslav First League: 1980–81
Yugoslav Cup: 1979

Medveščak Zagreb
Yugoslav Cup: 1988–89, 1989–90

USAM Nîmes
Coupe de France: 1994

Badel 1862 Zagreb
Croatian First League: 1994–95, 1995–96
Croatian Cup: 1995, 1996
EHF Champions League runner-up: 1994–95

Yugoslavia
1988 Summer Olympics – 3rd place

Croatia
1993 Mediterranean Games – 1st place
1994 European Championship – 3rd place
1995 World Championship – 2nd place 
1996 Summer Olympics – 1st place

Individual
Best right wing at the 1995 World Championship
1995 World Championship Dream Team
Best Croatian handballer of 1995 by the HRS
Best Croatian handballer of 1995 by Sportske novosti
Best right wing at the 1996 Summer Olympics
1996 Summer Olympics Dream Team
Franjo Bučar State Award for Sport: 1996
LNH Division 1 top goalscorer: 1999–00 – 174 goals
LNH Division 1 top goalscorer:  2001–02 – 185 goals

Coach

Croatia (assistant) 
2003 World Championship – 1st place 
2004 Summer Olympics – 1st place
Franjo Bučar State Award for Sport: 2004
2005 World Championship – 2nd place

Croatia U-21
2005 World Championship – 3rd place 
2007 World Championship – 2nd place

Egypt
2008 African Championship – 1st place

Bosna Sarajevo
Bosnian First League: 2009–10, 2010–11
Bosnian Cup: 2009–10

Lokomotiva Zagreb
Croatian First League: 2013–14
Croatian Cup: 2013–14

Orders
 Order of Danica Hrvatska with face of Franjo Bučar – 1995, 2004

References

External links
 
 
 
 

1961 births
Living people
Yugoslav male handball players
Croatian male handball players
Handball players at the 1988 Summer Olympics
Handball players at the 1996 Summer Olympics
Olympic handball players of Yugoslavia
Olympic handball players of Croatia
Olympic bronze medalists for Yugoslavia
Olympic gold medalists for Croatia
Sportspeople from Banja Luka
Olympic medalists in handball
RK Medveščak Zagreb players
RK Zagreb players
RK Zamet players
RK Zamet coaches
Medalists at the 1996 Summer Olympics
Medalists at the 1988 Summer Olympics
Mediterranean Games gold medalists for Croatia
Competitors at the 1993 Mediterranean Games
Croatian handball coaches
Mediterranean Games medalists in handball
Bosniaks of Croatia